The Shnookums & Meat Funny Cartoon Show is a half-hour American animated comedy television series produced by Walt Disney Television Animation and aired in 1995 as a spin-off of the show Marsupilami, a spinoff itself of Raw Toonage. The show represents Disney's attempt to do a more "edgy" cartoon in the vein of Nickelodeon's The Ren & Stimpy Show and Rocko's Modern Life. Unlike other Disney Afternoon cartoons, Shnookums & Meat only aired once a week, usually Mondays. Only thirteen episodes were produced.

Shnookums and Meat have a cameo appearance in the end credits for the 2022 film Chip 'n Dale: Rescue Rangers.

Premise
This animated series actually follows three segment series.

Shnookums & Meat
This segment involves a cat named Shnookums (voiced by Jason Marsden) and a dog named Meat (voiced by Frank Welker) who do not get along very well. Their owners are unseen stock characters only viewed from the neck down and named (appropriately enough) Husband & Wife (voiced by Steve Mackall and Tress MacNeille). Husband is always referring to their home as their "domicile" before the two leave their pets in charge while they are away.

Pith Possum: Super Dynamic Possum of Tomorrow
A spoof of the Batman comics, with the superhero Pith Possum (voiced by Jeff Bennett) and his sidekick Obediah the Wonder Raccoon (voiced by Patric Zimmerman) fighting crime in Possum City when called by the gorilla Commissioner Stress (voiced by Brad Garrett) and the monkey Lieutenant Tension (voiced by Jess Harnell). Pith Possum's true identity is lowly tabloid copyboy Peter Possum. Pith Possum fights various enemies with his recurring one being a mad lumberjack named Dr. Paul Bunion (voiced by Jim Cummings). Pith Possum (even when in his true identity) also has developed a crush on a female human reporter named Doris Deer (voiced by April Winchell) who mostly loves Pith Possum more than his true identity. It was stated in the first episode that Pith Possum was an ordinary lab opossum until he gained ultra opossum-like abilities upon an experiment gone wrong. The titles of the episodes are completely unrelated to their contents but rather (usually) over the top titles always using the word 'dark' or 'darkness' and often with the words 'black' and 'night' (e.g., The Phantom Mask of the Dark Black Darkness of Black, Return of the Night of Blacker Darkness, Return of the Dark Mask of Phantom Blackness, etc.). Jim Cummings provided the narration in most episodes.

Tex Tinstar: The Best in the West
A parody of Wild West serials involving the cowboy Tex Tinstar (voiced by Jeff Bennett), his horse Here Boy, and Tex's friends Smelly Deputy Chafe (voiced by Charlie Adler), Percy Lacedaisy (voiced by Corey Burton), and Floyd the Insane Rattlesnake (voiced by Jess Harnell) who always get into trouble when pursuing a group of outlaws called the Wrong Riders consisting of Wrongo (voiced by Brad Garrett), Ian (voiced by Corey Burton in a homage to Paul Frees' character Inspector Fenwick from Dudley Do-Right), and Clem. The end of each episode ends in a cliffhanger for next week (not unlike the Wild West serials or "Rocky and Bullwinkle"). Jim Cummings narrated each installment in a Western accent.

Episodes

Cast
 Charlie Adler as Chafe, Pearl (in "Dark Quest for Darkness")
 Jeff Bennett as Pith Possum/Peter Possum, Tex Tinstar
 Corey Burton as Ian, Percy Lacedaisy, Krusty Rustknuckle, Ultra Guy Man Dude (in "The Light of Darkness")
 Jim Cummings as Narrator, Dr. Paul Bunion, Mr. Kane, Ralph Bear (in "Return of the Night of Blacker Darkness"), Supper Squirrel (in "Dark of the Darker Darkness"), Caped Cod (in "The Light of Darkness")
 Brad Garrett as Commissioner Stress, Wrongo, Super Water Buffalo (in "Son of the Cursed Black of Darkness"), Shirley Pimple (in "Bride of Darkness"), Santa Claus (in "Jingle Bells, Something Smells")
 Jess Harnell as Lieutenant Tension, Floyd the Insane Rattlesnake, Polite Coyotes, Easter Bunny Imposter (in "Phantom Mask of the Dark Black Darkness of Black"), Al Dog (in "Return of the Night of Blacker Darkness"), Spidey (in "Bride of Darkness"), Power Weasel (in "The Light of Darkness"), Bat Guy (in "The Light of Darkness")
Bill Kopp as Polite Coyote
 Steve Mackall as Husband
 Tress MacNeille as Wife, Burglar (in "Kung-Fu Kitty"), Cat Girl (in "Step-Ladder to Heaven"), Dog Girl (in "Step-Ladder to Heaven")
 Jason Marsden as Shnookums
 Frank Welker as Meat, Flea (in "Bugging Out!"), Elves (in "Jingle Bells, Something Smells"), Fish Monster (in "Something's Fishy"), TV Announcer (in "Night of the Living Shnookums"), Panicking Dog (in "Step-Ladder to Heaven"), Supervisor (in "Step-Ladder to Heaven")
 April Winchell as Doris Deer, Registration Lady (in "The Light of Darkness"), Wowee Woman (in "The Light of Darkness")
 Patric Zimmerman as Obediah the Wonder Raccoon

Production
Shnookums & Meat was created and written by Bill Kopp, who also created Toonsylvania and Mad Jack the Pirate. The show was directed by Jeff DeGrandis. Kopp was the voice of Eek! The Cat and Yuckie Duck from The What-A-Cartoon! Show on Cartoon Network.

The idea for a series starring a cat and dog was pitched to Kopp and DeGrandis by Greg Weisman, a development executive at Walt Disney Television Animation who was also developing Gargoyles at the time.

Disney previously reached out to Carbunkle Cartoons (one of the animation studios that worked on The Ren & Stimpy Show) to work on the show's animation, but was denied due to their unwillingness to put up the same amount of money that they get from Spumco.

Segments on "Marsupilami"

Shnookums & Meat originated as a segment on Disney's 1993 series Marsupilami. Five episodes were shown on that series, and were later run again as part of the actual Shnookums & Meat series in 1995. These episodes were:
"Kung-Fu Kitty"
"I.Q. You, Too"
"Night of the Living Shnookums"
"Something's Fishy"
"Jingle Bells, Something Smells"

Broadcast history
The series aired on The Disney Afternoon on Mondays between January 2 to March 27, 1995 in the timeslot normally occupied by Bonkers. Reruns were later shown on Toon Disney. The Tex Tinstar segments were shown out of order on the Disney Channel UK in 2003 to fill the then frequently gapped schedule. The show last aired on Friday, July 6, 2007, on Toon Disney during the Mega Jam block.

Following the launch of the Disney+ video on demand streaming service in November 2019, Shnookums and Meat along with Aladdin (based on the 1992 film of the same name) are the only Disney Afternoon series not seen yet on the platform.

Reception

Critical Reception 
Reviewing the series for The Washington Post, Scott More found the main Shnookums & Meat segments to be the weakest, preferring Tex Tinstar and especially Pith Possum, singling out Jeff Bennett's voice work on both segments for praise. Kenneth M. Chanko of the New York Daily News gave the series a positive review, stating that, while not up to the same standard as series like Warner Bros. Animation's Animaniacs or Nickelodeon's Rocko's Modern Life, he considered it "a hoot and a half". Evan Levine of the Newspaper Enterprise Association noted that his son liked it, and felt that it had good animation and clever humor, saying, "kids may enjoy the freewheeling mix of physical comedy and silliness."

As of May 1995, it was reported that Shnookums & Meat had a rating of 4.1/16 among kids 2–11, 4.3/18 among kids 6–11, and 1.7/13 among teenagers. Kopp had claimed in an interview with Animato! that these numbers would've been enough to justify a renewal on a competing network, citing Fox Kids as an example. Despite this, it was quietly cancelled after only one season; it was removed from the Disney Afternoon lineup at the start of the 1995–96 television season.

Comparisons 
Martin "Dr. Toon" Goodman of Animation World Magazine described The Shnookums & Meat Funny Cartoon Show as one of two The Ren & Stimpy Show "clones", with the other one being 2 Stupid Dogs.

References

External links

 
 
 The Shnookums and Meat Funny Cartoon Show at Retrojunk

1990s American animated television series
1990s American anthology television series
1995 American television series debuts
1995 American television series endings
American animated television spin-offs
American children's animated anthology television series
American children's animated comedy television series
Animated television series about cats
Animated television series about dogs
The Disney Afternoon
Disney Channel original programming
English-language television shows
First-run syndicated television programs in the United States
Television series by Disney Television Animation